Motor Madness is a 1937 American drama film directed by D. Ross Lederman and starring Joseph Allen, Rosalind Keith and J.M. Kerrigan.

Plot
After speedboat racing champion Joe Dunn wins a preliminary race, he is offered a bribe to deliberately lose the race for the championship. A fight ensues, and Joe is jailed and his girlfriend, Peggy McNeil, replaces him in the race.

Peggy crashes the boat and is seriously injured. Joe gets out of jail and desperately seeks money to pay for an operation to save Peggy's life.

Cast
 Joseph Allen as Joe Dunn
 Rosalind Keith as Peggy McNeil
 J. M. Kerrigan as Henry John 'Cap' McNeil
 Marc Lawrence as Gus Slater
 Richard Terry as Nick Givens
 Arthur Loft as 'Lucky' Leonard Raymond
 Joe Sawyer as Steve Dolan (as Joseph Sawyer)
 George Ernest as 'Pancho', Runaway Kid
 Al Hill as Henchman Jeff Skinner
 John Tyrrell as Pete Bailey
 Ralph Byrd as C.P.O. Mike Burns

References

External links
 

1937 films
1937 drama films
Boat racing films
American drama films
American black-and-white films
1930s English-language films
Films about the United States Coast Guard
Films directed by D. Ross Lederman
Columbia Pictures films
1930s American films